William Dale Fries Jr. (November 15, 1928 – April 1, 2022) was an American advertising executive and spoken word artist who won several Clio Awards for his advertising campaigns. He is best known for his character C. W. McCall, a truck-driving country singer he originally created for a series of bread commercials; Fries later assumed the role of McCall for a series of outlaw albums and songs in the 1970s, in collaboration with co-worker (and Mannheim Steamroller founder) Chip Davis. McCall's most successful song was "Convoy", a surprise pop-crossover hit in 1975, reaching number 1 on the Billboard Hot 100 chart and number 2 in the British charts in March 1976.  Fries was elected mayor of Ouray, Colorado, and served in that position from 1986 to 1992.

Early life
McCall was born Billie Dale Fries on November 15, 1928, in Audubon, Iowa.   He later legally changed his name to William Dale Fries, Jr.  His father was also called Billie and so he was the junior.  One of his sons is now Bill Fries III.

His family was musical as his father performed with his two brothers in  The Fries Brothers Band, though his day job was as a foreman at a factory for farm equipment.  His father played the violin while his mother, Margaret, played the piano and the two played ragtime together at dances.  Their son first performed at the age of three in a local talent contest, singing "Coming ' Round the Mountain" while his mother played the piano.  He studied music at school, playing the clarinet and the music of John Philip Sousa and became the drum major for the school's marching band.  As a child, he enjoyed listening to country music, but he was even more interested in art, having started copying the cartoon characters of Walt Disney as a child.  He went to the Fine Arts School at the University of Iowa where he majored in commercial art and also performed in the university's symphony orchestra.  But he had to leave the university after one year as he could not afford to compete with the many demobbed soldiers who were going through college on the GI Bill of Rights.  He then returned to Audubon to work as a signwriter.

In 1950, he got a job as a commercial artist with KMTV in Omaha, Nebraska.  He worked for them for ten years, doing graphic work, lettering and set design.  He also supported the local ballet and opera societies, doing work which won an award from the Omaha Artists and Art Directors Club.  This attracted the attention of Bozell & Jacobs which was a local advertising agency and they gave him a job as an art director, doubling his salary.

He married Rena Bonnema on February 15, 1952; the two remained married for 70 years until his death. At the time of his death he had three children, four grandchildren, four great-grandchildren and one great-great-grandchild.  His hobbies included model railroading and working on his old military jeep.

Advertising
In 1973, while working for Bozell & Jacobs, Fries created a television advertising campaign for Old Home Bread.  The bread was trucked across the Midwest from the Metz Baking Company's plant in Sioux City, Iowa.  As the big semi-trailer trucks carrying the Old Home Bread logo were a familiar sight on the highway, this suggested a trucking theme.   The advertisements featured deliveries of the bread to the Old Home café, whose name expanded to become the "Old Home Filler-Up an' Keep on a-Truckin' Café".   Its waitress was named Mavis after a real waitress at the White Spot café in Audubon where Fries grew up.  Her role was to flirt with the truck driver who was named C. W. McCall.  The name McCall was inspired by McCall's magazine, which Fries had on his desk at the time.  A James Garner movie, Cash McCall, was also an influence.  To complete the name, Fries added initials, shown embroidered on the trucker's shirt, and chose "C. W." for country and western.

Singing
The commercial won a Clio Award and its success led to other trucking songs such as  "Wolf Creek Pass" and "Black Bear Road". Fries wrote the lyrics and sang while Chip Davis, who wrote jingles at Bozell & Jacobs, wrote the music. Classically-trained Davis went on to create Mannheim Steamroller and win Country Music Writer of the Year in 1976, despite not liking the genre.

McCall is best known for the 1976 No. 1 hit song, "Convoy" which was inspired by his own experience of driving in a growing group of vehicles out of Denver.  Its theme of using CB radio to rebel against the new federal speed limit of 55 mph was popular and topical so the single sold over two million copies and was awarded a gold disc by the RIAA in December 1975. Though McCall is not a one-hit wonder, "Convoy" went on to become his signature song. McCall first charted the song "Wolf Creek Pass", which reached No. 40 on the U.S. pop top 40 in 1975. Two other songs reached the Billboard Hot 100, "Old Home Filler-Up an' Keep on a-Truckin' Cafe", as well as the environmentally-oriented "There Won't Be No Country Music (There Won't Be No Rock 'n' Roll)". "Classified" and "'Round the World with the Rubber Duck" (a pirate-flavored sequel to "Convoy") bubbled under the Hot 100. A dozen McCall songs appeared on Billboards Hot Country Singles chart, including the sentimental "Roses for Mama" (1977).

In 1978, the movie Convoy was released, based on the C. W. McCall song. The film starred Kris Kristofferson, Ali MacGraw, Burt Young, and Ernest Borgnine and was directed by Sam Peckinpah. It featured a new version of the song, written specially for the film.

The song "Convoy" is featured in Grand Theft Auto V. In 2014, Rolling Stone ranked "Convoy" No. 98 on their list of 100 Greatest Country Songs.

In addition to the "original six" McCall albums released between 1975 and 1979, two rare singles exist. "Kidnap America" was a politically/socially-conscious track released in 1980 during the Iran hostage crisis, while "Pine Tar Wars" referred to an event that actually happened in a New York Yankees–Kansas City Royals baseball game during 1983 (a dispute concerning the application of a large quantity of pine tar to a baseball bat used by George Brett, one of the Royals' players).

Politics and later life in Ouray

Fries and his family vacationed in Ouray, Colorado, during the 1960s.  They then bought a summer home there after the financial success of "Convoy".  When Fries stopped touring, he retired to Ouray with his family.  In 1986, Fries was elected mayor of the town and served three terms of two years each.  His main achievement as mayor was to restore the historic city hall, which had burnt down in 1950.  Another major project was the San Juan Odyssey.  This was an audiovisual exhibition which had originally been a slide show at Wright's Opera House.  C. W. McCall had provided the narration for this in 1979 and it was shown to hundreds of thousands of visitors until the show closed in 1996.  He then revised and digitized the production so that it could be shown in modern formats such as DVD.

Fries died on April 1, 2022, at age 93, from complications of cancer. In an interview Fries conducted on February 9, he gave his blessing for the use of his signature song "Convoy" for the Freedom Convoy protests in Canada, with Taste of Country noting that he was "energized and enthusiastic" about the revival of interest in the song and its message.

Discography

Studio albums

Compilation albums

Singles

References

Bibliography
 Bernhardt, Jack. (1998). "C.W. McCall" in The Encyclopedia of Country Music. Paul Kingsbury, Editor. New York: Oxford University Press. p. 333.

External links
 C.W. McCall Old Home Bread ads
 C.W. McCall: An American Legend
 San Juan Odyssey
 Bozell Jacobs
 
 
 
 C.W. McCall obituary in Best Classic Bands

1928 births
2022 deaths 
American country singer-songwriters
American male singer-songwriters
People from Audubon, Iowa
Polydor Records artists
MGM Records artists
Mayors of places in Colorado
Musicians from Iowa
People from Ouray, Colorado
Singer-songwriters from Colorado
Singer-songwriters from Iowa
Deaths from cancer in Colorado 
Deaths from lung cancer
20th-century American male singers
20th-century American singers
21st-century American male singers
21st-century American singers